The 1879 Ohio gubernatorial election was held on October 14, 1879. Republican nominee Charles Foster defeated Democratic nominee Thomas Ewing Jr. with 50.25% of the vote.

General election

Candidates
Major party candidates
Charles Foster, Republican 
Thomas Ewing Jr., Democratic

Other candidates
A. Sanders Piatt, Greenback
Gideon T. Stewart, Prohibition
John Hood, Independent

Results

References

1879
Ohio